Béla Pál (born 5 October 1953) is a Hungarian educator and politician, member of the Hungarian Socialist Party (MSZP). He served as Secretary of State of the Prime Minister's Office from 2002 to 2003, Secretary of State for Economic Affairs and Transport from 2003 to 2004, and Secretary of State for Regional Development and Cohesion from 2004 to 2006. He was a Member of Parliament (MP) between 1994 and 2014.

References

1953 births
Living people
Hungarian educators
Members of the Hungarian Socialist Workers' Party
Hungarian Socialist Party politicians
Members of the National Assembly of Hungary (1994–1998)
Members of the National Assembly of Hungary (1998–2002)
Members of the National Assembly of Hungary (2002–2006)
Members of the National Assembly of Hungary (2006–2010)
Members of the National Assembly of Hungary (2010–2014)
People from Zalaegerszeg